Jaydon Mickens (born April 21, 1994) is an American football wide receiver for the New York Giants of the National Football League (NFL). He played college football at Washington, and signed with the Oakland Raiders as an undrafted free agent in 2016. Mickens won a Super Bowl title as part of the Buccaneers in Super Bowl LV over the Kansas City Chiefs.

College career 
Mickens played college football at Washington, where he appeared in the majority of his career by changing his jersey number from 4 to 1 during his junior and senior years before he qualified for the 2016 NFL Draft. He had good, but unspectacular numbers, leading the team in receptions and receiving yards his junior and senior seasons but never cracking the Top 10 in the conference; he was the Huskies kick returner his freshman year, but only returned four punts over his college career, recording no touchdowns in either role.

Professional career

Oakland Raiders 
Mickens signed with the Oakland Raiders as an undrafted free agent on May 12, 2016. He was waived by the Raiders on September 3, 2016 and was signed to the practice squad the next day. After spending the entire 2016 season on the practice squad, he signed a reserve/future contract with the Raiders on January 9, 2017. He was waived by the team on September 2, 2017.

Jacksonville Jaguars
On September 19, 2017, Mickens signed with the Jacksonville Jaguars' practice squad. He was promoted to the active roster on October 21, 2017. In Week 9, against the Cincinnati Bengals, he recorded a 63-yard punt return touchdown in the fourth quarter in a 23–7 win, earning him AFC Special Teams Player of the Week. In Week 14, Mickens had a 72-yard punt return, but was stopped on the one-yard line, which set up a touchdown to give the Jaguars a 14-point lead over the  Seattle Seahawks, again winning AFC Special Teams Player of the Week honors. As a receiver, he recorded one reception prior to Week 15, but had four for 61 yards and two second-quarter touchdowns in a playoff-clinching 45–7 win over Houston.

On October 15, 2018, Mickens was placed on injured reserve after suffering a fractured ankle in Week 6.

Carolina Panthers
On July 24, 2019, Mickens was signed by the Carolina Panthers. He was waived during final roster cuts on August 30, 2019.

Tampa Bay Buccaneers
On December 19, 2019, Mickens was signed to the Tampa Bay Buccaneers practice squad. He was promoted to the active roster on December 24, 2019. He was waived on July 31, 2020, but re-signed on August 9. He was placed on the reserve/COVID-19 list by the team on November 14, 2020, and activated on November 30. He was waived on December 7, 2020, and re-signed to the practice squad two days later. On December 30, 2020, Mickens was signed to the active roster. Mickens was the Buccaneers' kickoff returner for Super Bowl LV, a 31–9 victory over the Kansas City Chiefs.

On August 31, 2021, Mickens was released by the Buccaneers and re-signed to the practice squad. He was signed to the active roster on September 10, 2021. He was waived on October 18 and re-signed to the practice squad.

Jacksonville Jaguars (second stint)
On November 24, 2021, Mickens was signed by the Jacksonville Jaguars off the Buccaneers practice squad.

New York Giants
On December 14, 2022, Mickens was signed to the New York Giants practice squad. He signed a reserve/future contract on January 22, 2023.

Personal
Mickens was arrested in Los Angeles on a felony firearm charge on March 11, 2021.

References

External links
Tampa Bay Buccaneers bio
Jacksonville Jaguars bio
Oakland Raiders bio
Washington Huskies bio

1994 births
Living people
American football wide receivers
Carolina Panthers players
Jacksonville Jaguars players
New York Giants players
Oakland Raiders players
Players of American football from Los Angeles
Susan Miller Dorsey High School alumni
Tampa Bay Buccaneers players
Washington Huskies football players